Bernard Michael Shanley (August 4, 1903 – February 25, 1992) was an American lawyer and politician best known for his work with U.S. President Dwight D. Eisenhower. He served under President Eisenhower as Deputy White House Chief of Staff, Appointments Secretary (1955–1957) and Special Counsel (1953–1955).

Biography
Shanley was born in Newark, New Jersey on August 4, 1903 and began his career in law in 1929. A Fordham University School of Law graduate, he was a member of the New Jersey Bar and the United States Supreme Court Bar. His law career was quite extensive, and his professional memberships included Fellow of the American Bar Foundation, the American Bar Association, the Essex County and Somerset County Bar Associations, and the American Judicature Society.  Shanley was a founder of the prominent New Jersey law firm, Shanley & Fisher, P.C., which grew into one of New Jersey's largest and most distinguished law firms before merging with Drinker Biddle & Reath in November 1999.

Shanley's work in politics extended throughout state and national political arenas. As an integral contributor to and supporter of the Republican Party, he served as the Chairman of the New Jersey Republican Finance Committee and Council of Legal Advisors, as well as the Republican National Committeeman for New Jersey from 1960 through 1964, and again from 1968 until his death in February 1992. Shanley was the Republican candidate for United States Senate from New Jersey in 1964, losing to Democratic incumbent Harrison A. Williams.

During World War II, Shanley served in the United States Army from 1942 through 1945.

Shanley was a college roommate, fraternity brother, and baseball teammate of Lou Gehrig at Columbia University during the early 1920s.

He died on February 25, 1992.

External links
Diaries of Bernard M. Shanley, Dwight D. Eisenhower Presidential Library
Bernard Shanley Papers(The Monsignor Field Archives & Special Collection Center at Seton Hall University) - Contains the professional and personal papers of Bernard M. Shanley covering his time with the Eisenhower White House and Campaign, through his political campaign and later career as an Republican National Committeeman.

|-

|-

1903 births
1992 deaths
20th-century American lawyers
Columbia College (New York) alumni
Fordham University School of Law alumni
Lawyers from Newark, New Jersey
New Jersey Republicans
Politicians from Newark, New Jersey
Military personnel from New Jersey
White House Counsels
United States presidential advisors
Eisenhower administration personnel